With residency beginning in 1727, Adam Miller (Mueller) is recognized as the first permanent white settler in the Shenandoah Valley of Virginia, US. Born in 1703 in Schriesheim, Germany, Miller immigrated to America as a young married man, settling in Lancaster County, PA in 1724.

On a trip through eastern Virginia, Miller heard reports about a lush Valley to the west which had been discovered by Governor Alexander Spotswood's legendary Knights of the Golden Horseshoe Expedition. In 1727, Miller and his wife Barbara moved from Pennsylvania to Virginia and staked out a claim on the south fork of the Shenandoah River, near the line that now divides Rockingham County from Page County.

The year of Miller's 1727 arrival in the Valley is confirmed in a 1742 naturalization proclamation by Virginia Governor William Gooch, which states, "And Adam Miller ... having Settled and Inhabited for fifteen years past on Shenandoa in this colony". Miller's birthplace is also cited in the proclamation, which notes that he was "born at Shesoin in Germany", but the correct spelling of "Schriesheim" is cited on the reverse side of the original document, written out and signed by Adam Miller.

Shenandoah baptismal records show that Miller and his wife had at least three children: Catarina Elizabetha (b. December 20, 1734), Adam Jr. (b. July 16, 1736) and Anna Christina (b. October 18, 1738). In adulthood, Catarina (Catherine) and Anna married brothers, John Baer and Jacob Baer, respectively.

In 1741, Miller purchased , including a large lithia spring, near Elkton, Virginia, and lived on this property for the remainder of his life. He sold  of this property to his son-in-law, Jacob Baer, and the spring on Miller’s land is still known as Bear Lithia Spring. In 1758, Miller fought in the French and Indian War, serving in the Company of Lt. Christian Bingaman. He died in 1783, with his estate settled in Rockingham County, VA.

See also
Shenandoah Germans

References

Bibliography 

American pioneers
Mennonitism in Virginia
Virginia colonial people
German emigrants to the Thirteen Colonies
1703 births
1783 deaths
People from Rhein-Neckar-Kreis